Events in the year 1972 in the Republic of India.

Incumbents
 President of India – V. V. Giri
 Prime Minister of India – Indira Gandhi
 Chief Justice of India – Sarv Mittra Sikri

Governors
 Andhra Pradesh – Khandubhai Kasanji Desai 
 Assam – Braj Kumar Nehru 
 Bihar – Dev Kant Baruah 
 Gujarat – Shriman Narayan
 Haryana – Birendra Narayan Chakraborty 
 Himachal Pradesh – S. Chakravarti
 Jammu and Kashmir – Bhagwan Sahay 
 Karnataka – Dharma Vira (until 1 February), Mohanlal Sukhadia (starting 1 February)
 Kerala – V. Viswanathan 
 Madhya Pradesh – Satya Narayan Sinha 
 Maharashtra – Ali Yavar Jung 
 Manipur – B. K. Nehru (starting 21 January)
 Meghalaya – B.K. Nehru 
 Nagaland – B.K. Nehru 
 Odisha – 
 until 30 June: Shaukatullah Shah Ansari 
 1 July-8 November: Sardar Yojendra Singh 
 starting 8 November: Basappa Danappa Jatti  
 Punjab – Dadappa Chintappa Pavate
 Rajasthan – Sardar Hukam Singh (until 1 July), Sardar Jogendra Singh (starting 1 July)
 Tamil Nadu – Kodardas Kalidas Shah 
 Tripura – B. K. Nehru
 Uttar Pradesh – 
 until 30 June: Bezawada Gopala Reddy
 1 July-13 November: Shashi Kant Varma
 starting 14 November: Akbar Ali Khan 
 West Bengal – Anthony Lancelot Dias

Events
National income - 552,453 million

January - June 
 21 January – Manipur, Tripura and Meghalaya gets statehood.
 19 March – India and Bangladesh sign a friendship treaty, after the withdrawal of the Indian troops.
 14 June - Japan Air Lines Flight 471 crashed at Palam, Delhi killing 82 of the 87 on board.
 26 June - Reserve Bank of India fixes buying and selling rates of Pound sterling with Indian rupee at £5.2910 and £5.2632 per Rs. 100 following the Government of the United Kingdom decision to float Pound sterling on 23 June. However the central rate remain unchanged at £5.2721 per Rs. 100.

July - December 
 2 July – Following Pakistan's surrender to India in the Indo-Pakistani War of 1971, both nations sign the historic bilateral Simla Agreement, agreeing to settle their disputes peacefully.
 4 July -  Reserve Bank of India revises buying and selling rates of Pound sterling with Indian rupee at £5.3333 and £5.3050 per Rs. 100 and kept central rates unchanged.
 10 July – A stampede of elephants kills 24 people in the Chandaka Forest, Orissa.
 17 October -  M. G. Ramachandran, forms the All India Anna Dravida Munnetra Kazhagam by splitting from Dravida Munnetra Kazhagam starting a new phase in Dravidian movement.
 19 October - Indian businessman Jayanti Dharma Teja sentenced to three year imprisonment for falsification of accounts of Jayanti Shipping Company.
 15 November - Jharkhand Mukti Morcha was formed for independent statehood of Jharkhand from Bihar on birthday of Birsa Munda

Law 
 5 April - Armed Forces (Assam and Manipur) Special Powers (Amendment) Act amended to include new states and union territories of Northeast India.
 15 August - Postal Index Number (PIN Code) introduced in India.
 9 September - Wild Life (Protection) Act, 1972 enacted.
 31 October – Supreme Court of India began hearing of Kesavananda Bharati v. State of Kerala case.

Births
24 February – Pooja Bhatt, actress, producer and director.
25 February  Gautham Vasudev Menon, film director and actor.
28 March – Eby J. Jose, journalist and human rights activist
15 April – Mandira Bedi, actress, model and television presenter.
20 April – Mamta Kulkarni, actress.
17 May – T. Udhayachandran, IAS.
8 July – Sourav Ganguly, cricketer.
28 July – Ayesha Jhulka, actress.
17 November  Roja Selvamani, actress and politician.
18 November – Zubeen Garg, Indian singer and actor
17 December – John Abraham, actor.
21 December – Jagan Mohan Reddy, politician.
26 December  Hari Gopalakrishnan, film director.

Deaths
31 March – Meena Kumari, actress (b. 1932).
14 April – George Reddy, Student and PDSU leader at OU campus Hyderabad (b. 1947)
29 May – Prithviraj Kapoor, actor and director (b. 1906)
20 July – Geeta Dutt, playback singer (b. 1930).

See also 
 List of Bollywood films of 1972

References

 
India
Years of the 20th century in India